The following is a list of transfers for the teams of the United Soccer League, the third tier of the United States soccer pyramid, for the 2015 season. The transactions begin at the conclusion of the 2014 USL Pro season and end after the championship match of the 2014 season. The first signing of the season was longtime Richmond Kickers midfielder Luke Vercollone who joined expansion side Colorado Springs Switchbacks FC as the club's first-ever signing. New players who are listed on a club's official roster but no official announcement was made appear at the end of the list.

Transfers

References

External links 
USL Pro official

USL
USL
Transfers
2015